Pro-Line Racing is a manufacturer of wheels, tires, accessories and bodies for 1/10-scale on- and off-road radio-controlled cars.

The company was founded in 1983 in Beaumont, California, United States and is headquartered there. It quickly established a name for itself as a producer of quality products by capturing seven off-road national championships in 1992.

In 1993, tires swept both the 2WD and the 4WD classes at the IFMAR Offroad Championships, the company's second and third World Championship titles. 1995 saw Pro-Line win its fourth and fifth IFMAR World Championships at Japan's Yatabe Arena.

That same year, Pro-Line Racing purchased independent body manufacturer PROTOform Race Bodies, retaining founder Dale Epp to expand the company's market share. That partnership continues today and has placed Pro-Line Racing near the very top of the R/C body market.

Their marketing strategy has expanded in recent years to include PLUGZ, a series of custom Class II and Class III trailer hitch receiver covers for full-sized vehicles, as well as So Real 1/24-scale die-cast static car models.

External links 
 Pro-Line Racing home page

Toy brands
Radio-controlled cars
Companies based in Riverside County, California
Beaumont, California
Tire manufacturers of the United States